Marina Tsintikidou (born 1971) is a Greek fashion model and presenter who has appeared on the covers of numerous Greek fashion magazines such as MAX. She won the title of "Star Hellas" (Σταρ Ελλάς) in the Miss Star Hellas pageant in 1992. She also carries the honor of being the third Greek contestant to win the title of Miss Europe (1992). She also represented Greece at the Miss Universe 1992 pageant in Bangkok, Thailand.

Aside from a modeling career, Tsindikidou also tried her skills in acting, appearing in various TV shows and movies as well as in the Greek version of the theatrical play "Look Who's Here" by British playwright Ray Cooney. She has also been a TV host and presenter on numerous programs featured on Mega Channel, ANT1 and Macedonia TV.

References

External links
Kostetsos Modeling
Gallery of TV Screenshots
Marina Tsidikidou at Greek Women On-Line

1971 births
Greek beauty pageant winners
Greek female models
Greek television actresses
Greek television presenters
Living people
Miss Europe winners
Miss Universe 1992 contestants
Greek women television presenters
Models from Thessaloniki